Fighter Squadron 1 or VF-1 was an aviation unit of the United States Navy. Originally established as Fighter Squadron 41 (VF-41) on 26 March 1945, it was redesignated VF-1E on 15 November 1946, redesignated as VF-1 on 1 September 1948 and disestablished on 20 November 1948. It was the fourth US Navy squadron to be designated VF-1.

Operational history

Following the disestablishment of VF-66 in October 1945 its pilots and FR-1 Fireballs were transferred to VF-41.

In November 1945 the squadron was attempting to qualify its pilots for carrier operations, but only 14 of its 22 pilots made the six required takeoffs and landings with a number of accidents occurring when the nose gear failed on landing.

Ryan installed a steel fork for the nosewheel, but inspections also revealed evidence of partial wing failures so the aircraft was limited to maneuvers not to exceed 5 Gs. VF-41 suffered three fatal accidents in 1946, one aircraft collided with the target banner during gunnery practice and spun into the water, a few months later, the squadron commander was performing a barrel roll when his wing broke off and he struck another FR-1, killing both pilots.

VF-1E conducted carrier qualification in March 1947 aboard  and only eight pilots successfully qualified, not least because the FR-1s were proving to be too fragile to endure repeated carrier landings. During one brief deployment in June aboard , one aircraft broke in two during a hard landing. Subsequent inspections of the squadron's aircraft showed signs of structural failure and all the FR-1s were withdrawn by 1 August 1947.

Home port assignments
 NAS Sand Point

Aircraft assignment
 F6F-5 Hellcat
 FR-1 Fireball

See also
 History of the United States Navy
 List of inactive United States Navy aircraft squadrons
 List of United States Navy aircraft squadrons

References

External links

Strike fighter squadrons of the United States Navy